In mathematics, especially in algebraic geometry, the v-topology (also known as the universally subtrusive topology) is a Grothendieck topology whose covers are characterized by lifting maps from valuation rings.

Definition

A universally subtrusive map is a map f: X → Y of quasi-compact, quasi-separated schemes such that for any map v: Spec (V) → Y, where V is a valuation ring, there is an extension (of valuation rings)  and a map Spec W → X lifting v.

Examples

Examples of v-covers include faithfully flat maps, proper surjective maps. In particular, any Zariski covering is a v-covering. In fact, the perfection  of a scheme is a v-covering.

Voevodsky's h topology

See h-topology, relation to the v-topology

Arc topology

 have introduced the arc-topology, which is similar in its definition, except that only valuation rings of rank ≤ 1 are considered in the definition. A variant of this topology, with an analogous relationship that the h-topology has with the cdh topology, called the cdarc-topolgy was later introduced by Elmanto, Hoyois, Iwasa and Kelly (2020).

 show that the Amitsur complex of an arc covering of perfect rings is an exact complex.

See also

 List of topologies on the category of schemes

References

 
 
 
 
 

Algebraic geometry